The lieutenant governor of Virginia is a constitutional officer of the Commonwealth of Virginia. The lieutenant governor is elected every four years along with the governor and attorney general.  

The office is currently held by Winsome Earle Sears, who was elected in 2021 and is the first woman of color to hold this position. The governor and lieutenant governor are elected separately and thus may be of different political parties. The lieutenant governor's office is located in the Oliver Hill Building on Capitol Square in Richmond, Virginia.  The lieutenant governor serves as the President of the Senate of Virginia and is first in the line of succession to the governorship; in the event that the governor dies, resigns, or otherwise leaves office, the lieutenant governor becomes governor. In Virginia, the governor is not permitted to serve consecutive terms but the lieutenant governor may do so, and has no term limit. The Lieutenant Governor earns an annual salary of $36,321.

The office of lieutenant governor is of colonial origin and can be traced to the Virginia Council of London. The Council was appointed by the King, and in turn, the Council appointed the lieutenant governor or deputy. When the English crown forbade colonial governors' absence from the colonies without leave in 1680, it became the Council's duty to designate or send a deputy who could exercise all the powers of the governor under the written instructions of both the crown and the governor. Virginia's first Constitution, adopted in 1776, provided a Council of State from which a president was annually selected from its members. The president acted as lieutenant governor in the case of the death, inability, or necessary absence of the governor from the government. The Virginia Constitution of 1851 abolished the governor's Council of State and provided for the popular election of the lieutenant governor.  Shelton Farrar Leake, from Albemarle County, was the first elected lieutenant governor, serving from 1852 to 1856.

Constitutionally, the lieutenant governor is president of the Senate of Virginia, as is the case with many other lieutenant governors in the United States. Unlike many of her counterparts, the lieutenant governor regularly presides over Senate sessions rather than delegating this role to the president pro tempore or majority leader.

Since the late 1920s, the lieutenant governor has been one of only three positions that competes in a statewide election in Virginia (along with the governor and attorney general). Because the governor cannot serve consecutive terms, the incumbent lieutenant governor is often considered a leading candidate for governor.

List of lieutenant governors of Virginia
 Parties

References

External links
Lieutenant Governor of Virginia's website
List of past Lieutenant Governors